Limekiln Lake is a lake located south of Inlet, New York. Fish species present in the lake are brown trout, rock bass, splake, rainbow smelt, white sucker, bluegill, black bullhead, yellow perch, and sunfish. There is a state owned hard surface ramp off NY-28 on the north shore, located 3 miles southeast of inlet. Power-boats are allowed on this lake.

References

Lakes of New York (state)
Lakes of Hamilton County, New York
Lakes of Herkimer County, New York